This is an overall list of statistics and records of the Asia Cup, which was a One Day International tournament until 2016, since when it has alternated as a Twenty20 International tournament.

One day Internationals

Records and statistics

Most runs

Most wickets 

Source:ESPNCricinfo

Most runs in the tournament

Most wickets in the tournament

Man of the tournament

Man of the match (in final)

Twenty20 Internationals

Records and statistics

Most runs

Highest individual scores

Highest average

Most 50+ scores

Other results

General statistics by tournament

Results of host teams

See also
 List of Asia Cup centuries
 List of Asia Cup five-wicket hauls
 Women's Asia Cup

References

Records
Asia Cup